The 2007 Legislative Programme was drawn up by the Government of the United Kingdom for the parliamentary session beginning 6 November 2007 and ending on the 22 July 2008. The Legislative Programme was compiled by Gordon Brown's government, approved by his Cabinet, and laid out in the Speech from the Throne on the first day of the parliamentary session by the Monarch.

Unlike previous years, the Government outlined a draft legislative programme on 11 July 2007. This was done, according to a statement by Prime Minister Gordon Brown, because "it is now right in the interests of good and open government and public debate that each year the Prime Minister make a summer statement to this House so that initial thinking, previously private, can now be the subject of widespread and informed public consultation."

Government Bills
The programme outlined 29 bills that the Government intended to introduce over the coming parliamentary session. As of 21 June 2008, five had been enacted by Royal Assent, 18 were in progress, and 7 were at draft stage and hadn't been submitted to Parliament.

The discrepancy between the 29 proposed bills in the Legislative Programme and the 30 bills listed below is caused by the Banking (Special Provisions) Act 2008, which was introduced as emergency legislation by Chancellor of the Exchequer Alistair Darling in February 2008 in order to nationalise Northern Rock.

Before being submitted to Parliament, a draft is written by the Government. This becomes a bill in Parliament and passes through both houses in 9 sequential stages, finally achieving Royal Assent and being enacted as law (Act). It passes through one house (five stages) and then the other (four stages), and may start in either the House of Commons or the House of Lords. If the bill is rejected at any stage, it does not pass to the next stage in the process.

In the first house, the bill passes through five stages 1st Reading (1), 2nd Reading (2), Committee (3), Report (4), and 3rd Reading (5). In the second house, the bill passes through four stages: 1st Reading (6), 2nd Reading (7), Committee (8), and Report (9).

References

Legislative programmes
Legislative Programme